Makhosazana Xaba (born 10 July 1957) is a South African poet.  She trained as a nurse and has worked a women's health specialist in NGOs, as well as writing on gender and health. She is Associate Professor of Practice in the Faculty of Humanities at the University of Johannesburg.

Biography
Makhosazana (Khosi) Xaba was born in Greytown, KwaZulu-Natal, to Glenrose Nomvula Mbatha and Rueben Bejanmin Xaba, the second of five children. She has an MA degree in creative writing from Wits University and is working on a biography of Noni Jabavu.

Xaba won the Deon Hofmeyr Award for Creative Writing (2005) for her unpublished short story "Running". Her poems have appeared in publications including Timbila, Sister Namibia, Botsotso, South African Writing, Green Dragon and Echoes, and have been collected in These Hands (2005) and Tongues of Their Mothers (2008). A book of her short stories, Running and Other Stories, was published in 2013, and won the 2014 Nadine Gordimer South African Literary Awards Short Story Award. She is also a contributor to the 2019 anthology New Daughters of Africa, edited by Margaret Busby.

Works
These Hands: Poems. Timbila Poetry Project, Elim Hospital, Limpopo Province, 2005. Poetry. .
Tongues of Their Mothers. Scottsville: University of KwaZulu-Natal Press, 2008. Poetry. .
Running and Other Stories.  Cape Town: Modjaji Books, 2013. Fiction. .
Like the Untouchable Wind: An Anthology of Poems (editor). Harare. 2016. Poetry anthology. 
The Alkalinity of Bottled Water. Botsotso, 2019. Poetry.

References

Mzamisa, Palesa (2008). "New voices", Wordsetc, Third Quarter, pp. 31–36.

Living people
1957 births
South African women poets
University of the Witwatersrand alumni
Lambda Literary Award winners
South African women short story writers
South African short story writers
21st-century South African poets
21st-century South African women writers
21st-century short story writers
People from Greytown, KwaZulu-Natal